Meet Bros is an Indian musical duo from Gwalior, Madhya Pradesh. The duo consists of brothers Manmeet Singh and Harmeet Singh. They were formerly known as Meet Bros Anjjan with longtime collaborator Anjjan Bhattacharya.

Initially starting out as actors, the duo switched to composing and singing after the success of their first song "Jogi Singh Barnala Singh". They began with composing for Isi Life Mein and Do Dooni Chaar but it was with Kyaa Super Kool Hain Hum and OMG – Oh My God! that they got their first recognition as music directors.

Meet Bros' most well-known and critically acclaimed songs are "Baby Doll" from Ragini MMS 2 and "Chittiyaan Kalaiyaan" from Roy. Both songs feature the vocals of Kanika Kapoor and the latter was part of a soundtrack that fetched them multiple awards including the Filmfare Award for Best Music Director, the Screen Award for Best Music Director, and the IIFA Award for Best Music Director.

Early life
Meet Brothers are biological brothers from Gwalior. Their early education took place in Scindia School, Gwalior Fort, Gwalior. After this they went to Mumbai for higher education. Harmeet completed his graduation from Sydenham College, Mumbai. They started acting in TV serials and Bollywood to step in, but after the success of their solo song "Jogi Singh Barnala Singh", they chose music, leaving the acting. After that they started working as music director in films. Other than being a popular television personality, Manmeet has also produced a couple of serials for television including a hit comedy serial for Star Plus. While Harmeet had done advertising commercials and acted in Hindi soaps such as Kahani Ghar Ghar Ki and Kkusum. Both have not received formal education in music. Both have worked in the TV serial Kyunki Saas Bhi Kabhi Bahu Thi and Shagun.

Career
After leaving acting, Meet Brothers worked as a music director in Bollywood. Many years ago, they met Anjjan Bhattacharya in a program and the three decided to work together and they named their trio as Meet Bros Anjjan. The three together made music for many songs and gave their voices. They made the song "Baby Doll", which they sang with Kanika Kapoor in the 2014 film Ragini MMS 2. In 2015, Anjjan Bhattacharya got separated from the trio and started his own music business. Meet Bros also opened their own recording studio named "Meet Bros Recording Studio".

"Pink Lips", "Hangover", "Party To Banti Hai", "Chittiyaan Kalaiyaan" were their songs. They both also hold concerts and take part in the concert. They have received the Filmfare Awards for their music.

Personal life
Older brother Manmeet married Karishma Modi in 2002 and they have a daughter. Karishma works in Hindi TV serials. Younger brother Harmeet Singh married actress Shefali Jariwala in 2004. The couple later got divorced in 2009. Later, Shefali married actor Parag Tyagi in 2015.

Discography

Film soundtracks

As Meet Bros Anjjan (2010–2015)

1 A different version of this song is included in the soundtrack.
2 One or more remixed version of this song is included in the soundtrack.

As Meet Bros (2015–present)

1 One or more remixed version of this song is included in the soundtrack.

Singles

Awards and nominations

As Meet Bros Anjjan

References

External links 
 Official website
 

Indian musical duos
People from Gwalior
Filmfare Awards winners
Living people
Indian film score composers
Indian male film score composers
Year of birth missing (living people)